The 1942 SANFL Grand Final was an Australian rules football game contested between a merger teams of Port Adelaide–West Torrens ("Port–Torrens") and West Adelaide– ("West–"), held at the Adelaide Oval on Saturday 19 September 1942. It was the 44th annual Grand Final of the South Australian National Football League, stated to determine the premiers of the 1942 SANFL season. The match, attended by 35,000 spectators, was won by Port–Torrens by a margin of 11 points, marking that mergers first premiership.

Background 
Due to logistics and a lack of resources the SANFL decided, starting in 1942, that the league would reduce from eight teams to four with geographical mergers between the neighbouring clubs the preferable configuration of the competition during World War II. The main justification for holding the competition during this period was to raise money for patriotic and charitable funds along with providing entertainment for troops stationed in Adelaide.

Before the game a curtain raiser match was played between an RAAF station and an anti-aircraft station of the AIF.

Teams

Scorecard

References 

SANFL Grand Finals
SANFL Grand Final, 1942